The Esgaroth Three is a musical comedy group from Wellington, New Zealand, known for their Middle-earth parody videos Who the 'Ell Is Tauriel? and Dwarf On A Pig.

Reception
The group gained praise for their debut video, Who The 'Ell Is Tauriel? from international science fiction and fantasy reviewers, and mainstream press, being described as "drolly trollish" on BBC America's Anglophenia website, "brilliant" and "hilarious" by SciFiNow magazine, and "delightfully nerdy" on TheOneRing.net.

Personnel
 Christopher Winchester – guitar, ukulele, vocals, clarinet, kazoo, percussion, drum and bass programming
 Carlton McRae – guitar, backing vocals

Dwarf On A Pig
The Esgaroth Three's second music video release Dwarf On A Pig was published on YouTube in December 2014. Like Who The 'Ell Is Tauriel?, the cast of the video is made up of extras from Peter Jackson's Hobbit films, but only Winchester is credited as responsible for the musical performance, with McRae listed as "Orc fodder in absentia".

References

External links
 Dwarf On A Pig by Christopher Winchester. (The Esgaroth Three. Video, YouTube. December 2014)
 Who the 'ell is Tauriel?. (The Esgaroth Three. Video, YouTube. December 2013)

Musical groups from Wellington
Music based on Middle-earth